Marcos Mauro López Gutiérrez (born 9 January 1991), known as Marcos Mauro, is an Argentine professional footballer who plays as a central defender for Spanish club UD Ibiza.

Club career
Born in Claypole, Buenos Aires, Marcos Mauro finished his youth career in Spain with CF Fuenlabrada after his parents had moved to the country in search of better working conditions. He made his senior debut on 4 January 2009, starting in a 3–0 Tercera División home loss against Real Madrid C.

Marcos Mauro established himself as a starter the following seasons, achieving promotion to Segunda División B in 2012. On 11 August 2013 he signed a four-year contract with Villarreal CF, being immediately loaned to SD Huesca of the third division.

On 1 September 2014, Marcos Mauro was loaned to La Roda CF in the same league. The following 10 August, he was assigned to Villarreal's reserves still in the third tier.

On 12 July 2017, Marcos Mauro joined Segunda División club Cádiz CF on a three-year deal. He made his professional debut on 19 August, starting in a 2–1 away win over Córdoba CF.

Marcos Mauro scored his first goal in division two on 18 November 2018, his team's second in a 3–1 away defeat of Córdoba. On 21 July 2020, after promoting to La Liga (17 matches and two goals from the player), he agreed to an extension until 2022. His bow in the latter competition took place on 12 September 2020 in the 0–2 home loss to CA Osasuna, and he scored his first goal the following 4 April to help the hosts beat Valencia CF 2–1.

On 29 December 2022, following a brief spell at Liga MX side FC Juárez, Marcos Mauro returned to Spain and its second division with UD Ibiza.

Career statistics

Club

References

External links

1991 births
Living people
Sportspeople from Buenos Aires Province
Argentine footballers
Association football defenders
La Liga players
Segunda División players
Segunda División B players
Tercera División players
CF Fuenlabrada footballers
Villarreal CF B players
SD Huesca footballers
La Roda CF players
Cádiz CF players
UD Ibiza players
Liga MX players
FC Juárez footballers
Argentine expatriate footballers
Expatriate footballers in Spain
Expatriate footballers in Mexico
Argentine expatriate sportspeople in Spain
Argentine expatriate sportspeople in Mexico